Rocco Vata (born 18 April 2005) is a professional footballer currently playing as a midfielder for Celtic. Born in Scotland, he is a youth international for Ireland.

Club career
Born in Glasgow, Vata followed in the footsteps of his father, former professional footballer and Celtic player Rudi Vata by joining Celtic at the age of seven. He signed his first professional contract with the club in July 2021.

He was included in pre-season training with the Celtic first team ahead of the 2022–23 season, but was assigned to the club's B team in 2022, making his debut in the Lowland League the same year. Following impressive performances for Celtic's youth and B teams, he is seen as one of Celtic and Ireland's most promising players, and was linked with Italian clubs Juventus, Roma and AC Milan, as well as English sides Arsenal and Manchester City in October 2022.

Vata made his first team debut for Celtic on 28 December 2022, coming on as a substitute for Matt O'Riley as Celtic beat Hibernian 4–0 away at Easter Road.

International career
Vata is eligible to represent Albania through his father (who played for the Albania national team), the Republic of Ireland through his grandmother on his mother's side, Scotland by virtue of being born there, and Montenegro. He has represented the Republic of Ireland at youth international level.

Career statistics

Club

Notes

References

2005 births
Living people
Footballers from Glasgow
Republic of Ireland association footballers
Republic of Ireland youth international footballers
Scottish footballers
Irish people of Albanian descent
Irish people of Montenegrin descent
Scottish people of Irish descent
Scottish people of Albanian descent
Association football midfielders
Lowland Football League players
Scottish Professional Football League players
Celtic F.C. players